El Regreso de los Reyes (English: The Return of the Kings) is the debut studio album by Mexican-American cumbia group Cruz Martínez y Los Super Reyes. It was released on August 14, 2007 by Warner Music Latina. The royal edition (Spanish: edición real) was released on September 16, 2008. It has all the songs from the standard edition except for "Roses". It includes two remixes for "Muévelo" and two remixes for "Si Pudiera". It came with a DVD that includes the music videos for "Muévelo", "Serenata (Estrellita Mía)", "Muchacha Triste", and "Yo Seré". The album reached #130 on the United States Billboard 200 chart, and #3 on the United States Billboard Latin chart.

Track listing

Sales and certifications

References

2007 debut albums
Los Super Reyes albums
Albums produced by Cruz Martínez
Warner Music Latina albums
Spanish-language albums
Cumbia albums